Karmali railway station (station code: KRMI) is the third station (after Pernem and Tivim) within Goa, when entering from the north, under the jurisdiction of Konkan Railway. Karmali railway station is closest railway station to the State capital Panjim or Panaji, which is the administrative capital of Goa, and is located in the central part of Goa.

Administration 
It falls under Karwar railway division of Konkan Railway zone, a subsidiary zone of Indian Railways.

Location 
It lies is in Carambolim (also called Karmali) village of the Tiswadi sub-district of Goa State. Madgaon railway station in South Goa district is the largest, while Thivim railway station in North Goa comes at second place. The former is a gateway to South Goa, Margao, the urban area of Vasco da Gama and also the beaches of South Goa, while the latter is a gateway to Mapusa town, the emigration-oriented sub-district of Bardez and also the North Goa beach belt.

Amenities
In February 2016, The Times of India newspaper suggested that there had been a "Lack of basic amenities for commuters at Karmali station". Issues raised about the functioning of Karmali included unpunctual trains, discontinuation of the Jan Shatabdi Express and poor conditions.

Gallery

References

External links

Prepaid taxi services at KR stations in Goa on track?
Youth dies clicking selfie on railway track

Railway stations in North Goa district
Railway stations along Konkan Railway line
Railway stations opened in 1997
Karwar railway division
Transport in Panaji